Cai Guangliao (born September 1958) is a Chinese senior police officer who spent most of his career in Guangdong province. He was investigated by the Communist Party of China's anti-graft agency in January 2015 and removed from office in January 2015. Previously he served as the deputy director of the Social and Legislative Committee of the Guangdong Provincial Committee of the Chinese People's Political Consultative Conference. Cai is the third senior political adviser to come under investigation in Guangdong province.

Cai is a major general in the armed police, which is overseen by the military commission.

Life and career
Cai was born in Yingkou, Liaoning, in November 1973, while his ancestral home is in Jiexi County, Guangdong. During the Cultural Revolution, Cai became a sent-down youth and worked in Shixing County.

In September 1975, he was accepted to Guangdong Politics and Law Cadre Institute and graduated in September 1977. After college, he was assigned to the Guard Bureau with the Guangdong Public Security Department. And he served as deputy director of the general office of the Guangdong provincial Party committee and director of the Guard Bureau with the Guangdong Public Security Department from September 2003 to July 2012. He attained the rank of major general (shao jiang) in August 2006.

In February 2013, he was appointed the deputy director of the Social and Legislative Committee of the Guangdong Provincial Committee of the Chinese People's Political Consultative Conference. He was mainly in charge of security work in Guangdong, which borders on the Hong Kong and Macao special administrative regions.

Downfall
On October 30, 2014, he was taken away by anti-graft officers from the military's Discipline Inspection Commission. On January 13, 2015, he was removed from office.

On March 27, 2017, Cai was sentenced to 8 years for accepting bribes by the Guangzhou Intermediate People's Court.

References

1958 births
People from Yingkou
People's Republic of China politicians from Liaoning
Living people
Political office-holders in Guangdong
Chinese Communist Party politicians from Liaoning
Chinese police officers
Politicians from Yingkou